Honokohau Harbor is a marina in Kailua Kona, Hawaii, United States It was built during the 1960s on the lava seashore of western Hawaii Island.

Construction of the Harbor
As western Hawaii lacks a reasonable port, the plan of Honokohau Harbor was approved in 1965. Its actual construction was done between 1968 and 1970 by the U.S. Army Corps of Engineers, with the use of explosives in large amount against the lava rocks. The management of this harbor was transferred from Hawaii Department of Transportation to Division of Boating & Ocean Recreation, Department of Land & Natural Resources in 1990.

Facilities
Besides the marina in which 260 boats are moored, there are two boat ramps, a repair shop, a large parking lot, a restaurant "Harbor House", and a few boutiques. Dry dock and other dockside services are done by Gentry's Kona Marina in association with other companies.

Sightseeing
Various boat tours to swim with dolphins, watch whales, and do fishing in the ocean depart from this harbor.

Transportation
Honokohau Harbor is located at the end of Kealakehe Parkway, at the traffic light on Hawaii State Highway 19, five miles south of Kona International Airport.

Environmental
The harbor is located adjacent to Kaloko-Honokohau National Historical Park. An environmental assessment for the expansion of the harbor was submitted in 2012.

See also
 Hilo Harbor (in east Hawaii)
 Kawaihae Harbor (in northwest Hawaii)

References

External links
 Official Site
 Division of Boating & Ocean Recreation/Big Island Facilities, Hawaii Department of Land & Natural Resources

Hawaii (island)
Kailua-Kona, Hawaii
Ports and harbors of Hawaii
Geography of Hawaii County, Hawaii
Transportation in Hawaii County, Hawaii
1970 establishments in Hawaii